The State Office for the Protection of the Constitution is a state-level security agency in Germany.

In seven federal states of Germany, it is a semi-independent agency called  and reports to the state's interior ministry. In the nine remaining federal states, it is organized as a division within the state's interior ministry.

The following states, mostly Western German, have a detached :
 
 Bayerisches Landesamt für Verfassungsschutz
 
 
 
 
 Landesamt für Verfassungsschutz Sachsen

The following nine states, both in the East and West part, have a division within each state Interior Ministry handling constitutional protection:

See also 
 List of intelligence agencies of Germany

References